Chapman Johnson (March 12, 1777 – July 12, 1849) was a nineteenth-century American politician from Virginia.

Early life
Johnson was born in Louisa County. He earned a Bachelor of Arts from the College of William and Mary in 1802.

Career

As an adult, Johnson lived in Staunton, Augusta County, Virginia. He was elected Mayor of Staunton in 1808, and then served in the Virginia state Senate beginning in 1811 through 1831 from a district made up of Augusta, Rockbridge and Pendleton Counties.

In the War of 1812, Johnson was the elected captain of a volunteer company and was appointed aide to General James Breckinridge. He was governor of the University of Virginia from 1819-1845, and rector 1836-1845. 
 
Johnson was elected as a delegate to the Virginia Constitutional Convention of 1829-1830. There he was elected by the Convention to serve on the Legislative Committee. He was one of four delegates elected from the senatorial district made up his home district.

During the debates, he was a floor leader for the White Basis Party in the Convention, seeking reapportionment of the state legislature to represent citizens only, without weighting the legislature by counting slaves held as property. The existing regime made the eastern slave-holding counties a permanent majority in the General Assembly opposing direct election of the Governor and internal improvements to connect the western and eastern regions of the state.

Death
Chapman Johnson died July 12, 1849 at Richmond, Virginia.

political graveyard

References

Bibliography

Virginia state senators
1779 births
1849 deaths
People from Louisa County, Virginia
College of William & Mary alumni
Mayors of Staunton, Virginia
American military personnel of the War of 1812
People from Virginia in the War of 1812
19th-century American politicians